Empress Yuanzhen may refer to:

Duchess Dugu ( 6th century), posthumously honored as an empress by her son Li Yuan, the first emperor of the Tang dynasty
Lady Zhang (Zhu Quanzhong's wife) (died 904), posthumously honored as an empress by her son Zhu Youzhen, the last emperor of Later Liang